The Rector of Università Cattolica del Sacro Cuore (commonly known just as the Rettore) is the highest academic authority of the university.
The Rector legally represents the University, convenes and chairs the Board of Directors, the Executive Committee, the Academic Senate of the University and the Advisory Board of the Agostino Gemelli University Polyclinic . He May appoint one or more Vice Rectors to which it can delegate the exercise of certain functions. Remain in office for four years and is re-elected for no more than two consecutive terms.

History

The Università Cattolica del Sacro Cuore was inaugurated on 7 December 1921 and began operations with two faculties: Philosophy and Social Sciences. Gemelli is rector of the Cattolica until his death, widening teaching through the School of Law, Political Science, Humanities, Business and Economics in the Milan and the School of Agriculture, in Piacenza.

Upon the death of Francesco Vito, Ezio Franceschini was elected the third rector (1965-1968) and had to face the rise of student protests in 1968. Some professors found inadequate his action he sought a dialogue with the students. Taking advantage of his poor health, replaced him in the rectory with Giuseppe Lazzati, which followed a line of more decisive break with the demands for renewal.

Lorenzo Ornaghi has been serving as the Italy's Minister of Culture in the Monti cabinet since 16 November 2011. After the appointment of Professor Lorenzo Ornaghi as minister, all the powers and functions belonging to the office of rector were entrusted to the vicar vice chancellor, prof. Franco Anelli, for the term of Ornaghi's office.

Rectors of Cattolica
Agostino Gemelli (1921–1959)
Francesco Vito (1959–1965)
Ezio Franceschini (1965–1968)
Giuseppe Lazzati (1968–1983)
Adriano Bausola (1983–1998)
Sergio Zaninelli (1998–2002)
Lorenzo Ornaghi (2002-2012)
Franco Anelli (from 2012)

References

External links
 Official website of the Rector

Università Cattolica del Sacro Cuore